Schembri ([shkem-bree]) is an Italian/Maltese surname. Notable people with the surname include:

André Schembri (born 1986), Maltese footballer
Antonio Schembri (disambiguation), several people
Carmelo Schembri, Maltese judge
Eric Schembri (born 1955), Maltese footballer
Fabrizio Schembri (born 1981), Italian athlete
Karl Schembri (born 1978), Maltese writer and journalist
Keith Schembri (born 1975), Maltese politician
Nino Schembri (born 1974), Brazilian mixed martial artist
Salvinu Schembri (1923–2008), Maltese footballer

Italian-language surnames